Buru Regency is a regency of Maluku province, Indonesia. When it was first created on 4 October 1999, the regency encompassed the entire island (plus outlying islands, of which Amalau is the largest); but on 24 June 2008 the southern 40% of the island was split off to form a separate Buru Selatan (South Buru) Regency. The residual Buru Regency comprises the northern 60% of the island of Buru and covers an area of 7,595.58 km2. The population at the 2010 census was 108,445 and at the 2020 census this had increased to 135,238. The principal town lies at Namlea.

Administrative Districts 
At the time of the 2010 census the Buru Regency was divided into five districts (kecamatan), but subsequently this has been increased to ten districts by the splitting of the existing districts. The ten districts are tabulated below with their areas and their populations at the 2010 census and the 2020 census. The table also includes the location of the district headquarters, the number of administrative villages (rural desa and urban kelurahan) in each district, and its postal codes.

Notes: (a) including the offshore islands of Pulau Nirwana Besar and Pulau Nirwana Kecil. (b) including the offshore island of Pulau Batukapal. (c) the 2010 populations of these new districts are included in the figures for the districts from which they were split away.

References

Regencies of Maluku (province)